Meaghan Simister (born November 10, 1986 in Regina, Saskatchewan) is a Canadian Olympic luger who has competed since 2003.

In the 2005-2006, 2006-2007 and 2007-2008 seasons, Simister placed second in Canadian Championship competition.  At 2009-2010 Canadian Championships she placed third.

Simister's best finish at the FIL World Luge Championships was ninth in the women's singles event at Oberhof in 2008.

In the 2009-2010 Season she placed tenth at the World Cup in Altenberg, Germany, qualifying  for the 2010 Winter Olympics where she finished 25th. http://olympic.ca/team-canada/meaghan-simister/

Her first Olympics were the 2006 Winter Olympics in Turin.
During the Olympics on February 14, she sustained minor injuries on the luge track, in the third of four runs, when she went high on one of the corners of the track.

Personal life 
Simister was one of about 20 athletes in the 2006 Winter Olympics to have attended high school at the National Sport School in Calgary, Alberta.

References

External links
 

1986 births
Canadian female lugers
Living people
Lugers at the 2006 Winter Olympics
Lugers at the 2010 Winter Olympics
Olympic lugers of Canada
Sportspeople from Regina, Saskatchewan